The Jungle is a play written by Joe Robertson and Joe Murphy, founders of the Good Chance Theatre Company, and directed by Stephen Daldry and Justin Martin. The play follows the lives of characters living in the Calais Jungle migrant camp. The play won the South Bank Sky Arts Award for Theatre, and the 2018 BroadwayWorld UK Award for Best New Production of a Play.

Creative Crew

Productions 
The Jungle premiered at the Young Vic, London, from 7 December 2017 to 9 January 2018. After a successful sold-out run, the play made a West End transfer to the Playhouse Theatre from 16 June 2018 to 3 November 2018.

The play made its Off-Broadway premiere on 4 December 2018 at St Ann's Warehouse New York, running until 27 January 2019. The Jungle then moved to The Curran San Francisco, running from 26 March 2019 to 19 May 2019, receiving positive reviews. In April 2020 the play was intended to return to St Ann's Warehouse, New York, with further plans for a US tour throughout Spring / Summer 2021, however due to the COVID-19 pandemic the production was postponed to 2023. The show will run once again at St Ann's Warehouse from 18 February to 19 March, before moving to Shakespeare Theatre Company Washington DC from 28 March to April 16, 2023.

Awards

References 

2018 plays
English-language plays